{{DISPLAYTITLE:C22H25ClN2OS}}

The molecular formula C22H25ClN2OS (molar mass: 400.96 g/mol) may refer to:
 Clopenthixol, a typical antipsychotic drug
 Zuclopenthixol, a typical antipsychotic neuroleptic drug